Prunus cyclamina, called the cyclamin cherry (or cyclamen cherry), the Chinese flowering cherry, and in , the Xiangyang mountain cherry, is a species of flowering cherry native to China, preferring to grow at 1000–1300m above sea level. It has prolific, attractive pale pink flowers that bloom early and outlast many later-blooming cherries and, accordingly, excellent potential as an ornamental. In the Arnold Arboretum in Massachusetts two individuals have prospered for decades, never showing any signs of the typical diseases—including the nematodes, viruses and black knot—that afflict their Prunus neighbors.

Description
It is robust tree, usually 5 to 10m tall. Its bark is a dark purplishbrown with prominent lenticles. Young spring leaves are an attractive bronze color. The serrated leaves have a 0.8 to 1.2cm petiole, and are obovate-oblong or broadly elliptic, from 4.5 to 12cm long and 2.7 to 5.5cm wide. The leaves are a darker green on the top surface, with the underside glabrous, sometimes initially  pilose on the veins. Prunus cyclamina var. cyclamina, the more widely distributed variety, has subumbellate inflorescences with 3 to 4 flowers, and Prunus cyclamina var. biflora has umbellate inflorescences with two flowers. Each flower is 3 to 6cm wide and has about 32 stamens. The form of their deep pink calyxes resembles the corollas of cyclamen flowers, inspiring the specific epithet. The fruit, a drupe, is subglobose, purplishred, and 7.5 to 8.3mm in diameter with scant but tasty flesh. They are relished by birds.

Distribution
Cyclamin cherry is found in Guangdong, Guangxi, Hubei, Hunan, and Sichuan provinces in China.

Varieties
Prunus cyclamina var. cyclamina 
Prunus cyclamina var. biflora (双花山樱桃)

References

cyclamina
Cherries
Cherry blossom
Endemic flora of China
Flora of South-Central China
Flora of Southeast China
Plants described in 1912